Julie Mathilde Charlotte Claire Bertuccelli is a French director born February 12, 1968, in Boulogne-Billancourt.

She is particularly known for her documentary La Cour de Babel released in 2014 and the feature film L'Arbre released in 2010.

Biography

After studies in hypokhâgne, then khâgne, and a master of philosophy, Julie Bertuccelli became, for ten years, assistant director on many feature films, TV movies and short films with Otar Iosseliani, Rithy Panh, Krzysztof Kieślowski, Emmanuel Finkiel, Bertrand Tavernier, Jean-Louis Bertuccelli, Christian de Chalonge, René Féret, and Pierre Etaix.

Following an introduction to documentary filmmaking in 1993 at Ateliers Varan, she directed fifteen documentaries for Arte, France 3 and France 5, including Une liberté!, La Fabrique des Judges, Welcome to the department store, A world in fusion, Otar Iosseliani, the whistling blackbird, The Glasberg Mystery, Antoinette Fouque, what is a woman? ...

His first feature film Since Otar left ... has been crowned by twenty awards in France and abroad, including the Grand Prize of the Critics' Week at the 2003 Cannes Film Festival, the César de la meilleur first work in 2004, the Marguerite Duras Prize 2003 and the Michel d'Ornano Award 2003 in Deauville.

L'Arbre is her second feature film. It was nominated for three Césars.

Her documentary The Court of Babel, released in theaters in March 2014, has been selected in several festivals, including those of New York, Rome, Abu Dhabi, Sheffield, Rio, Montreal, Tokyo, Cairo, and San Francisco.

Her documentary Latest News from the Cosmos (November 2016), received the Audience Award from the Rencontres du Cinéma Documentaire in Montreuil and the FIFA Grand Prix in Montreal (2018).

Her last feature film, Claire Darling with Catherine Deneuve and Chiara Mastroianni, released in French theaters in February 2019 Claire Darling grossed $0 in North America and a total worldwide of $1 million. With 85 000 spectators in France, the film is a heavy public failure.

Julie Bertuccelli has chaired the Scam since June 2017, having been the first woman elected to this position in 2013, as well as the brand new Cinematheque of the documentary she created with Scam (with which she also created the Eye of 'Or, the Documentary Prize at the Cannes Film Festival in 2015). She was co-chair with Michel Hazanavicius of the Civil Society of Producers' Authors Producers (ARP) in 2016.

She is the daughter of the director Jean-Louis Bertuccelli and the widow of cinematographer Christophe Pollock.

Filmography

Director

Documentaries
 1993: Un métier comme un autre 
 1994: Une liberté ! 
 1995: Un dimanche en champagne 
 1995: Le Jongleur de Notre-Dame 
 1996: Trait d'union 
 1996: Saint-Denis, les couleurs de la ville 
 1997: La Fabrique des juges
 1999: Bienvenue au grand magasin 
 2000: Les Îles éoliennes (coll. Voyages, Voyages)
 2006: Un monde en fusion
 2006: Otar Iosseliani, le merle siffleur (Coll. Cinéastes de notre temps)
 2007: Stage Les chantiers nomades: l'acteur concret au cinéma, autour des objets
 2008: Le Mystère Glasberg 
 2008: Antoinette Fouque, qu'est-ce qu'une femme (Coll. Empreintes)
 2014: La Cour de Babel 
 2016: Dernières nouvelles du cosmos

Feature films
 2003: Depuis qu'Otar est parti…
 2010: L'Arbre
 2018:  Claire Darling

Scriptwriter
 2002: Depuis qu'Otar est parti…
 2010: L'Arbre
 2018: Claire Darling

Assistant director
 1988–1990: Divers série: Salut les homards, Les six compagnons, Souris noire from Pierre Étaix
 1990: Aujourd'hui peut-être from Jean-Louis Bertuccelli
 1990: Kaminsky, un flic à Moscou from Stéphane Kurc
 1991: Promenades d'été from René Féret
 1991: La Chasse aux papillons from Otar Iosseliani
 1992: Precheur en eau trouble from Georges Lautner
 1992: Trois couleurs: Bleu from Krzysztof Kieślowski
 1992: Trois couleurs: Blanc from Krzysztof Kieślowski
 1993: Les Dessous du Moulin Rouge from Nils Tavernier
 1994: Le Clandestin from Jean-Louis Bertuccelli
 1994: Madame Jacques sur la Croisette from Emmanuel Finkiel
 1995: L'Appât from Bertrand Tavernier
 1995: Le Bel Été 1914 from Christian de Chalonge
 1996: Brigands, chapitre VII from Otar Iosseliani
 1997: Un soir après la guerre from Rithy Panh

See also
 List of female film and television directors

References 

Living people
1968 births
French women film directors